The 1964 Illinois gubernatorial election was held in Illinois on November 3, 1964. The Democratic nominee, incumbent Governor Otto Kerner, Jr., won reelection against the Republican nominee, Charles H. Percy.

Election information
The primaries and general election both coincided with those for federal offices (United States President and congress) and those for other state offices. The election was part of the 1964 Illinois elections.

Turnout
In the primary election, turnout was 37.89% with 1,956,238 votes cast.

In the general election, turnout was 84.15% with 4,657,500 votes cast.

Democratic primary 
The Democratic primary was held on April 14, 1964. Incumbent governor Otto Kerner Jr. won without opposition.

Republican primary 
The Republican primary was also held on April 14. Business executive Charles Percy won the nomination against Illinois state treasurer William Scott, and a field of minor candidates.

Illinois secretary of state Charles F. Carpentier was originally running, but dropped-out in January after suffering a heart attack. Also originally running was Cook County Republican Party chairman Hayes Robertson, who had unsuccessfully challenged William Stratton in the 1960 Republican gubernatorial primary. Robertson also withdrew in January, throwing his support behind Scott.

General election

References 

Illinois
Illinois gubernatorial elections
gubernatorial